Endri Bakiu (born 6 November 1987) is an Albanian professional footballer who plays as an attacking midfielder for Turbina Cërrik in the Albanian First Division.

Club career
On 28 June 2010, Bakiu agreed personal terms and signed a one-year contract with Elbasani.

On 5 September 2015, Bakiu completed a transfer to Dinamo Tirana as a free agent, returning to his first club after 9 years.

On 27 January 2017, after a controversial departure from Sopoti, Bakiu joined fellow Albanian First Division side Turbina Cërrik on their bid to escape relegation.

References

External links

1987 births
Living people
Footballers from Tirana
Albanian footballers
Association football midfielders
FK Dinamo Tirana players
KF Bylis Ballsh players
KS Shkumbini Peqin players
KF Elbasani players
FK Tomori Berat players
KS Kastrioti players
KS Sopoti Librazhd players
KS Turbina Cërrik players
Kategoria e Parë players
Kategoria Superiore players